Frederick Young may refer to:
 Frederick Young (East India Company officer) (1786–1874), founder of the Sirmoor Battalion
 Frederick Young, perpetrator of the 2012 torture-murders of Jourdan Bobbish and Jacob Kudla in Detroit
 Frederick T. B. Young (1873–1940), merchant and political figure in New Brunswick, Canada
 Frederick C. Young (1896–?), his son, also merchant and political figure in New Brunswick, Canada
 Sir Frederick William Young (1876–1948), Australian politician
 Sir Frederick Young (writer) (1817–1913), traveller and writer on imperial affairs
 Frederic George Young (1858–1929), Oregon educator and historian, first editor of the Oregon Historical Quarterly
 Freddie Young (Frederick Archibald Young, 1902–1998), British cinematographer

See also
Fred Young (disambiguation)